Chester City  or City of Chester may refer to:

Chester, a city in Cheshire, England
Chester City F.C., a former association football club in Chester
Chester (district), the former local government district surrounding Chester
City of Chester (UK Parliament constituency)
 The city of Chester, Pennsylvania

Ships
, 1873 British transatlantic liner
, 1875 US coastal steamer wrecked at the Golden Gate near San Francisco, California

See also
Chester (disambiguation)